Standard Form 86 (SF 86) is a U.S. government questionnaire that individuals complete in order for the government to collect information for "conducting background investigations, reinvestigations, and continuous evaluations of persons under consideration for, or retention of, national security positions." SF 86 is distinguished from SF 85, which is used for public trust or lower-risk positions. The form is required to be completed by military personnel, government contractors, and government employees in order to receive a requisite security clearance. Information demanded in the form include any colleges or universities attended over the past three years, an account of the last ten years of the individual's employment, ties to foreign nationals and governments, overseas travel, a list of past residences, etc.

An online interface for completing the SF-86 is e-QIP, or the Electronic Questionnaires for Investigations Processing.

See also 
 Single Scope Background Investigation
 Standard Form 312

References

External links 
 Official form at Office of Personnel Management

Espionage
National security
SF-86
United States government secrecy
Classified information in the United States
United States Office of Personnel Management